Tumhare Liye is a 1978 Indian Hindi-language film directed by Basu Chatterjee. The film stars Sanjeev Kumar, Vidya Sinha and Ashok Kumar as leads with music scored by Jaidev.

Plot
The story begins in 1905 and propels forward to 1978 when Gauri (Vidya Sinha) and Prakash (Sanjeev Kumar) fall in love and marry against odds. Prakash is originally expected to marry Renuka (Neelam Mehra) but he chooses Gauri over her much to Renuka's displeasure.

After the wedding, the couple heads to Rajasthan for honeymoon on Gauri's insistence. However, Gauri starts behaving in a weird manner, lost in thoughts, pining for an unseen lover and begins to refuse Prakash's romantic advances. Gradually, Gauri takes ill and is hospitalised as her mental state deteriorates to an extent where she looks to end her life. Psychiatric treatment reveals a dark and troublesome past where Gauri (a vivacious girl) and Gangadhar Upadhyay (a reserved priest) fall in love while Kalawati, now Renuka tries to separate them to secure Prakash for herself.

Though a prince by birth, Gangadhar is sworn to the temple to be a sanyasi due to a family oath. Being a priest, he is barred socially to interact with women. However, after falling in love with Gauri, he breaks his celibacy by making love to Gauri and then disowns his priesthood. In anger, the temple head curses him to be deprived of his love and child until another girl sacrifices herself for him. Sometime later, Gauri becomes pregnant while Kalawati invites her (Gauri) to her house to forcefully poison her and kill her. When Gangadhar learns of Gauri and his unborn child's death, he to joins their tragic fate by committing suicide. This cycle goes on for several reincarnations until Gauri and Prakash come to know through Dr. Vachaspati (Vaidyaraj in their past life) that the child must not die to avoid a repeat of the past-birth tragedy.

Renuka vows to pull Prakash away from Gauri and prepares to push Gauri into taking poison once again. However they make her understand that if she kills Gauri, her unborn child dies too resulting in a repetition of the past tragedy. Renuka in a state of frustration realises that she can never get Prakash but successfully frees Gauri and Prakash from their curse by drinking the poison herself. The film concludes with Gauri and Prakash's child playing happily while deceased Renuka's photograph hangs above.

Cast
Sanjeev Kumar - Prakash/Gangadhar Upadhyay
Vidya Sinha - Gauri
Ashok Kumar - Dr. Vachaspati/Vaidyaraj
Neelam Mehra - Renuka/Kalavati
Anita Guha - Sheeladevi
Brahm Bhardwaj - Dr. Vyas
Suresh Chatwal - Vishal
A. K. Hangal - Bhavani
Dinesh Hingoo - Anokhelal
Pinchoo Kapoor - Mathadhar
Indrani Mukherjee - Saudamani
Ratnamala - Phoolkumari
Om Shivpuri - Tantrik
Zarina Wahab - Rajnartaki

Crew
Director - Basu Chatterjee
Cinematographer - K. K. Mahajan
Music Director - Jaidev Verma
Lyricist - Naqsh Lyallpuri
Playback Singers - Asha Bhosle, Lata Mangeshkar, Usha Mangeshkar

Music

References

External links
 

1978 films
1970s Hindi-language films
Films scored by Jaidev